Potaki may refer to:
 Potaki, Kerman
 Potaki, Khuzestan